Milan Petrović may refer to:

 Milan Petrović (musician) (born 1976), Serbian keyboard player, songwriter and composer
Milan Petrovic Quartet
 Milan Petrović (football coach), Slovenian football manager